Gusta Rune Lennart Velander (August 24, 1920 – March 13, 2014) was an American football coach and mechanical engineer. He served as the co-head football coach with Luther Gronseth at Augsburg College in Minneapolis, Minnesota in 1945, compiling 0–3. Velander died on March 13, 2014.

References

1920 births
2014 deaths
American mechanical engineers
Augsburg Auggies football coaches
University of Minnesota alumni
University of Wisconsin–Madison alumni
People from Laxå Municipality
Swedish emigrants to the United States